Fera  may refer to:
 Fera (band), a pop rock/singer-songwriter duo from Vancouver, British Columbia, Canada
 Fera (constellation), old name for the southern constellation Lupus
 Fera (fish), a local name for several fish species and the eponymous dish
 Fera Airport, Fera Island, the Solomon Islands
Fera Island, an island in Isabel Province, Solomon Islands
 Fera Science Limited, formerly the Food and Environment Research Agency, UK

FERA may refer to:
 Federal Emergency Relief Administration, US
 Federation of European Film Directors
 Foreign Exchange Regulation Act, India
 Fraud Enforcement and Recovery Act of 2009, US

See also 
 Ferae, a clade of mammals consisting of Carnivores and Pholidotes